The Yinka Dene Alliance is a coalition of six First Nations from northern British Columbia, organized to prevent the Enbridge Northern Gateway Pipelines being built through their traditional territories. The coalition first comprised the Nadleh Whut'en, Nak'azdli, Takla Lake, Saik'uz and Wet'suwet'en First Nations. The Tl'azt'en First Nation has since joined. These bands represent the interests of around 5,000 aboriginals. They are utilizing indigenous, Canadian and international law, and organizing various public protests across Canada.

Opposition to Enbridge Northern Gateway Pipelines 

The Northern Gateway project is a proposal by Enbridge Inc. to build a twin pipeline between Bruderheim, Alberta and Kitimat, British Columbia. The pipeline would carry natural gas condensate to Bruderheim, and crude oil to Kitimat, where it would be transported to Asia by oil tankers. The Yinka Dene Alliance, and many other First Nations groups, oppose the project because of the threat it poses to the environment, their ways of life, and their land rights.

The pipelines would cross nearly 800 streams and rivers, and oil tankers would have to navigate rough waters and jagged coasts. A pipe leak or oil tanker spill - which the Yinka Dene Alliance has deemed "inevitable" - could devastate the water supply, imperiling the ecosystem and local communities' health.  This poses a clear economic and cultural threat as well, since their ways of life depend on the waters, most notably through their fishing of the salmon population.

The Yinka Dene Alliance also opposes the project as a matter of land rights. The project would traverse around 50 First Nations' territories, much of which has never formally been ceded. Land title is still being negotiated through the BC Treaty Process. The Yinka Dene Alliance, whose traditional territories make up 25% of the land directly affected by the Northern Gateway project, argues that Enbridge has no legal right to proceed without First Nations' approval. However, based on the 1997 Delgamuukw case, the Supreme Court of Canada disagrees. According to Canadian law, the First Nations must be consulted, which is happening through the project's Joint Review Panel and through private negotiations between Enbridge and First Nations, but they do not have the power to veto. The Yinka Dene Alliance are not participating in the Joint Review Panel public hearings, calling them "bogus" on the grounds that the Canadian government has already made up its mind to support the project.

Save The Fraser Declaration 

The Save The Fraser Declaration is a document of indigenous law, banning the Northern Gateway pipeline, and any similar projects, from crossing the signatories' territories. The signatories declare: "We will not allow the proposed Enbridge Northern Gateway Pipelines, or similar Tar Sands projects, to cross our lands, territories and watersheds, or the ocean migration routes of Fraser River Salmon."

The Declaration was negotiated in November 2010 by the Yinka Dene Alliance and the St'át'imc Nation. It was then signed by representatives from over 60 First Nations, who call themselves the Save The Fraser Gathering of Nations.

On December 2, 2010, the Declaration was made public. The group took out a full-page advertisement in The Globe and Mail announcing their opposition to the project, and staged a march in Vancouver to deliver the Declaration to the Enbridge headquarters.

Many new signatories were added in ceremonies in Vancouver on December 1, 2011 and Edmonton on January 27, 2012. Over 130 First Nations have now signed the Save The Fraser Declaration.

Appeals to the international community 

On February 6, 2012, the Yinka Dene Alliance released an open letter to Chinese President Hu Jintao. Canadian Prime Minister Stephen Harper was about to meet Hu Jintao to discuss Chinese investment and trade in Canadian energy, which the Northern Gateway project would facilitate greatly. In the letter the Yinka Dene Alliance asked Hu Jintao to raise human rights concerns with Stephen Harper. They outlined a number of human rights issues concerning First Nations, including land rights, injustices in the judicial system, and the imposition of resource development projects like the Northern Gateway. On the same day, the Yinka Dene Alliance also released an open letter to the Chinese people, declaring their opposition to the Northern Gateway. In it they stated that an oil spill "could destroy the extremely rare spirit bear – a bear with white fur that is as beautiful as the Chinese panda bear".

The Yinka Dene Alliance has also appealed to the United Nations Committee on the Elimination of Racial Discrimination. In February 2012 they submitted a request, calling on the Committee to intervene against the Northern Gateway project on the basis that it infringed Aboriginal title. The complaint also argued that the Canadian government was practising a type of racial discrimination by prioritizing Enbridge's interests over the First Nations', by propagating negative images in the media of the First Nations's opposition, and by classifying Aboriginal groups as "adversaries" in a confidential internal document.   Anne Sam, from Nak'azdli First Nation, went to Geneva to speak to the committee as a representative of the Yinka Dene Alliance.

The Freedom Train 

From April 30 to May 9, 2012, the Yinka Dene Alliance sent 30 representatives travelling across Canada on the so-called Freedom Train. The protest began with a rally in Jasper, Alberta, and continued with events in Edmonton, Saskatoon, Winnipeg and Toronto. The final event was a protest outside Enbridge's annual general meeting (AGM). Wet'suwet'en Chief Na'Moks, Nadleh Whut'en Chief Martin Louie and Saik'uz Chief Jackie Thomas attended the AGM itself.

RCMP monitoring 

In May 2012 it emerged that the Royal Canadian Mountain Police (RCMP) had been closely monitoring the Yinka Dene Alliance for signs of "acts of protest and civil disobedience". The RCMP unit gathered evidence from public and social media sources, and seem to have also monitored private meetings. Chief Jackie Thomas, from the Saik'uz First Nation, said, "We've always been peaceful, but this is how they try to paint us as the enemy".

References

External links 
 
 Save the Fraser Gathering of Nations
 Freedom Train 2012
 Enbridge Northern Gateway Pipeline

First Nations in British Columbia
Oil pipelines in Canada
Enbridge
Proposed pipelines in Canada
Indigenous politics in Canada